This is a list of Gaelic Athletic Association athletes and teams who have won honours for Cavan GAA.

Men's Football

GAA All Stars Awards winners (football): 5

International Rules Representatives
A number of Cavan players have been selected to play International rules football for the Ireland team against Australia:

All-Ireland Senior Football Championships: 5

All-Ireland Minor Football Championships:2

All-Ireland Junior Football Championships:2
 1927, 2014

National Football Leagues:2

Ulster Senior Football Championships:40
1891, 1903, 1904, 1905, 1915, 1918, 1919, 1920, 1922, 1923, 1924, 1925, 1926, 1928, 1931, 1932, 1933, 1934, 1935, 1936, 1937, 1939, 1940, 1941, 1942, 1943, 1944, 1945, 1947, 1948, 1949, 1952, 1954, 1955, 1962, 1964, 1967, 1969, 1997, 2020

Ulster Under-21 Football Championships: 6
1988, 1996, 2011, 2012, 2013, 2014

Ulster Minor Football Championships: 6
1937, 1938, 1952, 1959, 1974, 2011

Ulster Junior Football Championships: 14
1914, 1915, 1916, 1924, 1927, 1932, 1936, 1938, 1940, 1941, 1944, 1957, 1962, 1984

Leinster Junior Football Championships: 2
2012, 2014

Dr McKenna Cup: 11
1936, 1940, 1943, 1951, 1953, 1955, 1956, 1962, 1968, 1988, 2000

Hurling

Ulster Senior Hurling Championship
Represented Ulster in the 1908 All-Ireland series, but lost the delayed Ulster final for that year when it was played (the following year) to Derry.

Ulster Junior Hurling Championship: 2
1983, 1985

All-Ireland Minor Hurling Championship: None
All-Ireland Minor 'C' Finalists 2012

Ulster Minor Hurling Championship: 1
Division 2 - 2014

Ulster Minor Hurling League: 1
Division 2 - 2014

National Hurling League
Division 4 - 1984

Ladies Football

All-Ireland Senior Ladies' Football Championship: 1
1977

All-Ireland Intermediate Ladies' Football Championship: 1
2013

All-Ireland Under-18 Ladies' Football Championship
Runner up 1980

All-Ireland Under-16 Ladies' Football Championship: 1
1977

National Football League: 2
Division 3 - 2008, 2010

Camogie

National Camogie Leagues: 1
Division 2 - 1981

All-Ireland Junior Camogie Championships: 1
Junior B - 2009

Handball

40x20 All-Ireland Championship
Senior Singles

Senior Doubles

Intermediate Singles

Intermediate Doubles

Minor Singles

Minor Doubles

40x20 Nationals
Open

Men's C

Hardball All-Ireland Championship
Minor Doubles

Junior Doubles

Irish One Wall Nationals
Men's Open

Men's B

U17

See also
Cavan Senior Football Championship

References

External links
 Official website
 List of Cavan teams that have won a national or provincial title

Cavan GAA